Gero Kretschmer and Alexander Satschko were the defending champions, but lost in the quarterfinals to Thomaz Bellucci and Marcelo Demoliner.

Pablo Carreño Busta and Guillermo Durán won the title, defeating Bellucci and Demoliner in the final, 7–5, 6–4.

Seeds

Draw

References
 Main Draw

Ecuador Open Quito - Doubles
Ecuador Open (tennis)